Muhamad Nazirul Hasif bin Mailang (born 26 July 1999) is a Malaysian professional footballer who plays as a midfielder.

References

External links

1999 births
UiTM FC players
Living people
Malaysian footballers
Association football midfielders